Toshiba Classic may refer to:
the Acura Classic, a tennis tournament known as the Toshiba Classic from 1994 to 1998.
the Toshiba Classic (golf), a golf tournament.